The Meadows Music & Arts Festival was an annual music festival held at Citi Field in Queens, New York City. The festival was produced by Founders Entertainment, which also produces the Governors Ball Music Festival. The inaugural year of the festival, which was held on October 1–2, 2016, was headlined by several artists, including: Kanye West, J.Cole, Kygo, and Chance the Rapper. The festival boasted 42 artists and four stages: Linden Blvd., Queens Blvd., Shea, and The Meadows. The festival was inspired by the cancellation of Kanye West's set during the Sunday of the 2016 Governors Ball Music Festival due to heavy rains. It was announced on March 20, 2017 that the festival would return September 15–17, 2017. On May 8, 2017, the official lineup was announced, featuring headliners Jay-Z, Red Hot Chili Peppers, and Gorillaz.

Musical acts

2016 
On Tuesday, June 21, 2016, Founders Entertainment announced the inaugural edition of the Meadows Music and Arts Festival alongside the full lineup. On July 27, 2016, Founders added Pretty Lights, Thomas Jack, and Mr. Twin Sister to the lineup. After much confusion as to a conflict The Weeknd had with Saturday Night Live, it was announced on September 22, 2016 that The Weeknd would move his headlining set to 6:15 PM EST and for J. Cole to take over their headlining duties and close out the first day. However, on September 30, The Weeknd confirmed via Twitter that due to various reasons, he could not play the Meadows Festival at all.

Saturday, October 1

Saturday, October 1

2017 
On May 8, 2017, the official lineup announcement was made for the 2017 festival, which was held September 15–17. The festival was headlined by Jay-Z, Red Hot Chili Peppers, and Gorillaz. Future, Nas, Bassnectar, and Weezer are also among the many artists who performed at the three day festival.
Below is the lineup listed in the order as they appeared on the official lineup poster, as of May 13, 2017:

Jay-Z
Red Hot Chili Peppers 
Gorillaz 
Future
Nas
Bassnectar
Weezer
Run the Jewels
LL Cool J feat. DJ Z-Trip
M.I.A.
Erykah Badu
Foster the People
Migos
Action Bronson
Big Gigantic
TV on the Radio
Two Door Cinema Club
Milky Chance
Blood Orange
Broken Social Scene
De La Soul
Joey Bada$$
Tegan and Sara
Tory Lanez
21 Savage
St. Paul & The Broken Bones
Ghostface Killah 
Flatbush Zombies
Sleigh Bells
Big Boi 
Marian Hill
Sky Ferreira
A-Trak
BADBADNOTGOOD
Lido
Broods
Antibalas
GTA
Lizzo
Swet Shop Boys
Big Wild
Wild Belle
Kamaiyah
Léon
Jacob Banks
Fantastic Negrito
Public Access T.V.
CRX
Circa Waves
Jordan Bratton
Youngr
Dams of the West
DREAMERS
Dave
Flor
Arkells
Formation
Mike Floss
Slaptop

References

External links
 Official Website Homepage

Music festivals in New York City
Rock festivals in the United States